Chardstock is a village and civil parish located on the eastern border of Devon, England off the A358 road between Chard and Axminster. The parish population at the 2011 Census was 828. The parish also contains the hamlets of Bewley Down, Birchill, Burridge, Holy City and Tytherleigh.

The parish is a major part of the electoral ward of Yarty. The ward population at the above census was 2,361.

The parish was in Dorset until 1896.  Historically it formed part of Beaminster Forum and Redhone Hundred.

The attractive village is surrounded by farmland and woodland and is within the Blackdown Hills Area of Outstanding Natural Beauty. The River Kit runs through the village.  The village church dates from the 19th Century.  The village also has a post office and pub.

The collection of work by Artist Kenneth Butler Evans, cousin of poet William Butler Yeats, is based in the village at the home of his widow, sculptor Ann Ford.

Prebend
During the Middle Ages, Chardstock was a prebend of the Cathedral church of Salisbury.

Freedom of the Parish
The following people and military units have received the Freedom of the Parish of Chardstock.

Individuals
 12 June 2019: Michael Dadds, Former Chardstock Parish Councillor.

Military Units

References

External links
Inspector Denning: Chardstock Victorian Policeman - UK Parliament Living Heritage

Devon County Council:  page on history of Chardstock

Villages in Devon